Malaysian motor vehicle import duties is an article describing the excise duty on imported vehicles into the country.

Background
Malaysia's car industry is dominated by two local manufacturers which are heavily supported by the government through National Car Policy e.g. trade barriers. These local manufacturers are Proton and Perodua.
These excise duties imposed on foreign manufactured cars have made them very expensive for consumers in Malaysia. These taxes are also one of the highest in the world.
This makes most foreign cars extremely expensive for buyers, although cheaper in other countries. These taxes cause a foreign car to cost almost three times or 200% more than the original price.

Notation
CBU = Complete built up
CKD = Complete knock down
MFN = Most favoured nation
ASEAN CEPT = Association of Southeast Asian Nations Common Effective Preferential Tariff

Passenger cars (including station wagons, sports cars and racing cars)

Source: http://maa.org.my/pdf/malaysia_duties_taxes_on_motor_vehicles.pdf

Four-wheel-drive vehicles 

Source: http://maa.org.my/pdf/malaysia_duties_taxes_on_motor_vehicles.pdf

Others (MPV & VAN) 

Source: http://maa.org.my/pdf/malaysia_duties_taxes_on_motor_vehicles.pdf

Commercial vehicles 

Source: http://maa.org.my/pdf/malaysia_duties_taxes_on_motor_vehicles.pdf

Motorcycles 

Source: http://maa.org.my/pdf/malaysia_duties_taxes_on_motor_vehicles.pdf

See also
 Automotive industry in Malaysia

References

Transport in Malaysia
Economy of Malaysia
Customs duties